Gwynnbrook Wildlife Management Area is an  Wildlife Management Area in Owings Mills, Baltimore County, Maryland. The property is a former game farm that was purchased by Maryland in 1919, and is the oldest WMA in the state.

References

External links
 Maryland Department of Natural Resources: Gwynnbrook Wildlife Management Area

Wildlife management areas of Maryland
Protected areas of Baltimore County, Maryland
Owings Mills, Maryland